Raitis Puriņš (born 20 May 1988) is a Latvian handball player for Celtnieks Rīga and the Latvian national team.

He represented Latvia at the 2020 European Men's Handball Championship.

References

External links

1988 births
Living people
Latvian male handball players
Sportspeople from Riga